Matthesia was a primitive bat genus in the family Palaeochiropterygidae. Matthesia is represented by two species known from the middle Lutetian of Geiseltal, Germany. It may be a junior synonym of Palaeochiropteryx.

References 

Prehistoric bat genera
Eocene bats